In chemistry, a nucleofuge is a leaving group which retains the lone pair of electrons from its previous bond with another species. For example, in the SN2 mechanism, a nucleophile attacks an organic compound containing the nucleofuge (the bromo group) which simultaneously breaks the bond with the nucleofuge.

After a reaction nucleofuges may contain either a negative or a neutral charge; this is governed by the nature of the specific reaction. 

The word 'nucleofuge' is commonly found in older literature, but its use is less common in current literature in which the term leaving group dominates.

See also
Electrofuge
Nucleophile
Electrophile

References

 

Organic chemistry